The 1967 Orange Bowl was the 33rd edition of  college football bowl game, played at the Orange Bowl in Miami, Florida, on Monday, January 2. The final game of the 1966–67 bowl season, it matched the eighth-ranked independent Georgia Tech Yellow Jackets and the Florida Gators of the Southeastern Conference (SEC). A slight underdog, Florida won 27–12.

New Year's Day was on Sunday in 1967, so the game was played the following day.

Teams

Georgia Tech

The #8 Yellow Jackets opened with nine wins, then lost at rival Georgia. They were making their first Orange Bowl appearance in fifteen years and were led by Bobby Dodd, completing his 22nd season as head coach.

Florida

The Gators were led on offense by quarterback Steve Spurrier, winner of the Heisman Trophy. They finished second to Georgia and Alabama, who went to the Cotton Bowl and Sugar Bowl, respectively. This was Florida's first Orange Bowl and their fourth bowl appearance in six years under head coach Ray Graves, a former assistant to Dodd at Georgia Tech.

Game summary

This was the third year the game was played at night, following the Rose Bowl.

Kim King threw a ten-yard touchdown pass to Craig Baynham to give Georgia Tech a 6–0 lead. In the second quarter, Graham McKeel scored on a touchdown plunge to put Florida up 7–6, which was the score at halftime.

Georgia Tech was deep in Florida territory in the third quarter when Bobby Downs intercepted a pass from King to give Florida the ball on their own six. On the next play, sophomore tailback Larry Smith broke free and ran 94 yards for a touchdown to give Florida a 14–6 lead.

In the fourth quarter, McKeel ran for another touchdown to make it 21–6; Larry Good scored from 25 yards out for the Yellow Jackets to close the gap to 21–12. Florida's Jack Coons caught a five-yard pass from Harmon Wages to end the scoring at 27–12, but that was the end of the scoring. Smith ran for 187 yards and was named the game's outstanding player.

Scoring
First quarter
Ga Tech – Craig Baynham 10-yard pass from Kim King (run failed)
Second quarter
Florida – Graham McKeel 1-yard run (Wayne Barfield kick)
Third quarter
Florida – Larry Smith 94-yard run (Barfield kick)
Fourth quarter
Florida – McKeel 1-yard run (Barfield kick)
Ga Tech – Larry Good 25-yard run (pass failed)
Florida – Jack Coons 5-yard pass from Harmon Wages (pass failed)

Statistics
{| class=wikitable style="text-align:center"
! Statistics !! Ga. Tech !!   Florida  
|-
|First Downs	||17 ||22
|-
|Rushes–yards	||46–197||48–284
|-
|Passing yards	||122 || 165
|-
|Passes (C–A–I) ||8–22–4 || 15–32–1
|-
|Total Offense	||68–319 ||80–449
|-
|Punts–average	||6–42.3 ||7–36.1
|-
|Fumbles–lost 	||2–1||1–1
|-
|Turnovers      ||5 ||2
|-
|Penalties–yards ||5–41 ||4–32
|}

Aftermath
Dodd retired after the game, though he stayed as athletic director at Georgia Tech until 1976. The Yellow Jackets returned to the Orange Bowl in 2010, and the Gators in 1999. Florida's next major bowl game was eight years later in the Sugar Bowl against Nebraska, while Georgia Tech did not play in another major bowl until the Orange in 2010.

In the previous thirteen Orange Bowls, a Big Eight Conference team was a participant twelve times. This was the last edition without the Big Eight for seven years, when Penn State defeated LSU in January 1974.

Both final polls were released prior to the bowl games.

References

Orange Bowl
Orange Bowl
Florida Gators football bowl games
Georgia Tech Yellow Jackets football bowl games
January 1967 sports events in the United States
Orange Bowl